{{Speciesbox
| image = 
| image_caption = 
| genus = Blepharoneura
| species = biseriata
| authority = Wulp, 1899
| subdivision_ranks = Subspecies
| subdivision = 
| synonyms = *Blepharoneura btseriata Aczel, 1950  
}}Blepharoneura biseriata is a species of tephritid or fruit flies in the genus Blepharoneura'' of the family Tephritidae.

Distribution
Mexico

References

Blepharoneurinae
Diptera of North America
Insects described in 1899